The Canton of La Souterraine is a canton situated in the Creuse département and in the Nouvelle-Aquitaine region of central France.

Geography 
An area of farming and forestry in the arrondissement of Guéret, centred on the town of La Souterraine. The altitude varies from 267m (Vareilles) to 456m (La Souterraine) with an average altitude of 354m.

Population

Composition 
At the French canton reorganisation which came into effect in March 2015, the canton was reduced from 10 to 7 communes:
Noth
Saint-Agnant-de-Versillat
Saint-Léger-Bridereix
Saint-Maurice-la-Souterraine
Saint-Priest-la-Feuille
La Souterraine
Vareilles

See also 
 Arrondissements of the Creuse department
 Cantons of the Creuse department
 Communes of the Creuse department

References

Cantons of Creuse